Voke may refer to:
Vokė, a river in Lithuania
Edward J. Voke (1889-1965), Mayor of Chelsea, Massachusetts, USA
Voke, a nicotine inhaler developed by Kind Consumer

See also 
E'voke, British vocal duo
Vokes (disambiguation)